Pendleton County is the name of two counties in the United States:

 Pendleton County, Kentucky 
 Pendleton County, West Virginia